William Bell (né Yarbrough; born July 16, 1939) is an American soul singer and songwriter. As a performer, he is probably best known for his debut single, 1961's "You Don't Miss Your Water"; 1968's top 10 hit in the UK "Private Number", a duet with Judy Clay; and his only US top 40 hit, 1976's "Tryin' to Love Two", which also hit No. 1 on the R&B chart. Upon the death of Otis Redding, Bell released the well-received memorial song "A Tribute to a King".

As a songwriter, Bell co-authored the Chuck Jackson hit "Any Other Way" (which was a cover since Bell issued it first) as a follow-up to "You Don't Miss Your Water"; Billy Idol's 1986 hit "To Be a Lover", which was first a hit for Bell under its original title "I Forgot to Be Your Lover"; and the blues classic "Born Under A Bad Sign", popularized by both Albert King and Cream.

Although he was a longtime recording artist for Stax Records, he is unrelated to the label's onetime president, Al Bell.

In 2017, Bell was awarded a Grammy for Best Americana Album for his record This Is Where I Live. He performed his hit "Born Under a Bad Sign" alongside Gary Clark Jr. at the 2017 Grammy Awards. Bell was also featured on Rolling Stones "Best of the Grammys" for that year.

His music has been sampled by artists such as Kanye West, Ludacris, and Jaheim.

Career
Bell was born in Memphis, Tennessee. He took the last name "Bell" as a stage name in honor of his grandmother, whose first name was Belle.

Bell sang in church as a child and considered himself a student of The Soul Stirrers, the popular gospel group led by Sam Cooke. At age ten, he began songwriting with the original composition "Alone on a Rainy Night". At the age of 14, Bell won a talent contest and began making a name for himself singing in Memphis-area clubs.

He made his first leap into the music scene backing Rufus Thomas. In 1957, Bell recorded his first sides as a member of the Del Rios, a teenage vocal group that caught the eye of Stax Records.

Bell was an early signing on Stax Records initially as a songwriter. Other notable Stax Records artists include Otis Redding, Sam and Dave, Isaac Hayes, and The Staple Singers.

Bell was the first male solo act to be signed to Stax Records and he was able to release several singles before joining the military. He continued to record singles while on break from deployment, including the song "Marching Off to War".

It was only after Bell finished his stint in the military that he was finally able to release his debut album, 1967's The Soul of a Bell, on Stax Records. Bell's top 20 single "Everybody Loves a Winner" was on this album.

Bell was a close friend of fellow Stax recording artist Otis Redding. Bell was supposed to be on the same tragic 1967 flight that led to Redding's death. "It started snowing so bad in Chicago, the promoter up there canceled my show," recalls Bell. The tragedy led to a collaboration between Bell and Booker T. Jones (of Booker T. & the M.G.'s) who Bell knew from high school and church. Bell and Jones released "A Tribute to a King" in honor of Redding and it quickly became a hit.

In 1967, Bell co-wrote an unintended Christmas hit, "Everyday Will Be Like a Holiday". The song remains one of Bell's most-recorded hits and serves as a classic R&B Christmas song. In 2017, Hot Press magazine named the hit the "Greatest Christmas record of all time".

Bell moved to Atlanta, Georgia, in 1969 and started Peachtree Record Company, his short-lived soul label.

During his time in Atlanta, he took acting lessons and played Stanley Kowalski in a production of A Streetcar Named Desire.
Bell later signed a two-year deal with Mercury Records, where he released the 1977 single "Trying to Love Two", which hit No. 1 on the R&B charts and No. 10 on the pop charts, and sold a million copies.

In 1985, he founded another label, Wilbe, and issued Passion, which found its most receptive audiences in the UK.

Two years later, Bell was inducted into the Georgia Music Hall of Fame and received the Rhythm & Blues Foundation's R&B Pioneer Award that same year. Starting in 1992, Bell took a hiatus from the recording studio, while still performing regularly. In 2000, he released an album of all-new material on Wilbe entitled A Portrait Is Forever. In 2003, he was honored with the W.C. Handy Heritage Award. It wasn't until six years after his previous album that he released the album New Lease on Life.

2010s to present
In 2016, Bell reactivated the Stax Records label to release a new album. Produced by John Leventhal, This Is Where I Live featured Bell performing a batch of new songs, along with a revived recording of "Born Under a Bad Sign". In 2017, the album was awarded a Grammy for Best Americana Album, which took Bell's career to new heights including a featured performance alongside other legendary Stax acts at BBC's 50 Years of Soul event at Royal Albert Hall in London, UK. Additionally, Bell was one of the final performances at BB King's Blues Club in NYC before it closed in the spring of 2018.

Bell was featured in the 2014 documentary film Take Me to the River that explored the heart of the enduring Memphis music scene. He was featured alongside other artists including Bobby Bland, Mavis Staples, and Snoop Dogg. Bell is currently involved in the sequel to the popular documentary, and he calls it "a powerful little film".

In 2016, Bell recorded This Is Where I Live, his first major label album in over 30 years. Bell was awarded a Grammy for Best Americana Album in 2017, which, in turn, had such a strong effect on his streaming data that Rolling Stone called him "the biggest winner of the night".

His song "You Don't Miss Your Water" is featured in the trailer and the first episode of the Cinemax TV series Quarry, which debuted in 2016.

On 1 September 2017, age 78, Bell performed live at the Royal Albert Hall BBC Proms with Jools Holland and his Rhythm & Blues Orchestra in a tribute concert to 50 years of Stax Records synonymous with Southern Soul music.

Bell spent time in 2017 and 2018 touring with a group of featured artists from Take Me to the River. The touring group was named one of the "10 Bands to See This Year" by Parade magazine.

In 2017, Bell performed twice on NPR Music's Tiny Desk Concerts. He performed with his own band and again with the touring Take Me to the River group.

Bell released the single "In a Moment of Weakness" in 2018 as part of the Amazon Original Produced By series. His song was produced by the Grammy Award-winning Matt Ross-Spang.

Bell performed at the Mempho Music Festival in Memphis, Tennessee on October 6, 2018 as part of a tribute set dedicated to Royal Studios. In 2019, Bell collaborated with Southern Avenue on their single "We've Got the Music".

Bell performed at the 2019 Blues Music Awards, where he was nominated for Best Soul Blues Male Artist.

Guitar legend Eric Clapton released a video for his 2018 cover of Bell's holiday song "Everyday Will Be Like a Holiday". Bell joined several other soul legends for BB King's tribute concert at the Capitol Theatre on February 16, 2020. A few months later, the National Endowment for the Arts named Bell one of their 2020 fellows, the "nation's highest honor in the folk and traditional arts. These lifetime honor awards of $25,000 are given in recognition of both artistic excellence and efforts to sustain cultural traditions for future generations."

Covered by
 Linda Ronstadt covered "Everybody Loves a Winner" on her 1973 album Don't Cry Now. 
 Homer Simpson of The Simpsons sang "Born Under a Bad Sign" on the 1990 album The Simpsons Sing the Blues.
 Cream covered "Born Under a Bad Sign" on their 1968 album Wheels of Fire. 
 Jimi Hendrix covered "Born Under a Bad Sign" on his album Blues, released posthumously in 1994. 
 Etta James covered "Born Under a Bad Sign" on her album Life, Love, and the Blues released in 1998. 
 911 covered "Private Number" for their 1999 album There It Is.
 Warren Haynes covered "Every Day Will Be Like a Holiday" on his 2011 album Man In Motion. 
 Carole King covered "Every Day Will Be Like a Holiday" on her 2011 album A Holiday Carole.
 Hall & Oates covered "Every Day Will Be Like a Holiday" on their 2006 album Home for Christmas. 
 The Byrds covered "You Don't Miss Your Water" on their 1968 album Sweetheart of the Rodeo.
 The Revelations and Tre Williams covered "I Forgot to Be Your Lover" on the 2012 soundtrack of the film The Man with the Iron Fists.
 Robert Cray covered "I Forgot to Be Your Lover" on his 2005 album Twenty.
 Melissa Etheridge covered "I Forgot to Be Your Lover", "Any Other Way", and "Born Under a Bad Sign" on her 2016 album Memphis Rock and Soul.
 Brian Eno covered "You Don't Miss Your Water" on the soundtrack to the Jonathan Demme film Married to the Mob.
 Bruce Springsteen covered "I Forgot to Be Your Lover" and "Any Other Way" on his 2022 album Only the Strong Survive.

Awards and honors
 W.C. Handy Heritage Award from the Memphis Music Foundation (2003)
 BMI Songwriters Award (2003)
 Featured in the Stax Museum of American Soul Music (2003)
 Lifetime Achievement Award from Americana Music Association (2016)
 Memphis Music Hall of Fame inductee (2016)
 Grammy Award win: Best Americana Album for This Is Where I Live (2017)
 Grammy Award nomination: Best Traditional R&B Performance for "The Three of Me" (2017)
 Four Blues Music Award nominations: Album (This Is Where I Live), Soul Blues Album (This Is Where I Live), Soul Blues Male Artist (2017) (The Blues Foundation, 2018), Best Soul Blues Male Artist (2019)
 Epitome of Soul Award presented to Bell by Stevie Wonder at The Consortium MMT event at the Horseshoe Tunica (2017)
 National Heritage Fellowship awarded by the National Endowment for the Arts (2020)

Notable performances
 Smithsonian Folklife Festival in Washington, D.C. (2011)
 Memphis Symphony Orchestra (2012) 
 "You Don't Miss Your Water" at the White House for "In Performance at the White House: Memphis Soul" (2013)
 Billboard Live in Tokyo (2015)
 Music Hall of Fame induction ceremony alongside Justin Timberlake (2015)
 The Cutting Room and MetroTech Commons as part of the Brooklyn Academy of Music’s Rhythm and Blues Festival Series (2016)
 Royal Albert Hall in London (2017)
 "Born Under a Bad Sign" with guitarist Gary Clark Jr. at the Grammy Awards (2017)
 Dakota Jazz Club in Minneapolis, Minnesota (2018)
 Bayfront Blues Festival in Duluth, Minnesota (2018)
 Mempho Music Festival in Memphis, Tennessee (2018)
 Blues Music Awards (2019)

Discography

Studio albums

Compilation albums
 The Best of William Bell (1988)
 The Very Best of William Bell (2007)

Singles

References

External links
William Bell official website
Soulwalking website discography
William Bell story and interview, part 1 (1956–69), at Soul Express
William Bell feature, part 2 (1970–2008), with a complete discography at Soul Express
Amny.com
William Bell feature on NYTimes.com
William Bell Interview - NAMM Oral History Library (2016)
An interview with Soul Express in August 2017

African-American male singer-songwriters
American rhythm and blues singer-songwriters
American soul singers
Musicians from Memphis, Tennessee
1939 births
Grammy Award winners
Living people
Stax Records artists
Singer-songwriters from Tennessee
National Heritage Fellowship winners
21st-century African-American male singers
20th-century African-American male singers